Walter Behrens is an Argentine former football goalkeeper. Behrens played for most of his career in clubs of Argentina and Chile. In Chile Buttice played for Universidad Católica and Rangers. He was part of the 1961 Universidad Católica team that won the Primera División de Chile.

Titles

References

Living people
Argentine people of German descent
Argentine emigrants to Chile
Argentine footballers
Argentine expatriate footballers
Club de Gimnasia y Esgrima La Plata footballers
Rangers de Talca footballers
Club Deportivo Universidad Católica footballers
Chilean Primera División players
Expatriate footballers in Chile
Naturalized citizens of Chile
Association football goalkeepers
Year of birth missing (living people)